Elizabeth Butler (born August 12, 1960) is an American singer-songwriter and musician whose musical style has been generally classified as Americana, pop, and folk.

Career
In 2004 Butler founded Running Home Records based in Houston, Texas. She was performing with Running Home, an Americana-country-jazz duo with Suzanne Comeaux Bucher that quickly garnered airplay and a widespread fan base. They performed for several years, but both were married and had children, so they put their music project on hold.

They released their debut album, Running Home, in 2006. It received international radio airplay on college radio stations, most notably in the United Kingdom, Australia, and the U.S.

Love & Loss & Stuff Like That, Butler's sophomore album released in 2014, received favorable reviews. Her single "Love Over Logic" won Best Country Song at the Indie Music Channel Awards in 2014, and "A1A (Settin' Myself Free)" won Best Country Recording. The latter was also nominated for Best Americana Song at the HMMA Awards (Hollywood Music in Media Awards) in 2014. In 2017, her single "If I Knew" charted on the Hot A/C Music charts.

Arun Shenoy also recorded a jazz version of "If I Knew," released on Narked Records in 2017.

Discography
 2006 - Running Home
 2014 - Love & Loss & Stuff Like That

Awards
{|class="wikitable sortable"
!Year
!Nominated Work
!Category
!Award
!Result
|-
| 2021 || Fighting With Angels || Best Folk/Acoustic || Hollywood Music in Media Awards  ||
|-
| 2021 || Fighting With Angels || Best Music Video || Swedish International Film Festival || 
|-
| 2018 || If I Knew|| Best Music Video || Bengals International Film Festival ||  
|-
| 2018 || If I Knew || Outstanding Achievement Award - Best Music Video || Cult Critic Film Festival ||  
|-
| 2018 || If I Knew  || Best Folk Song||Clouzine International Music Award|| 
|-
| 2017 || Lullaby ||  Best Female Vocalist and Best Americana Song || Global Music Award||  
|-
| 2017 || Summer and Fall Instrumental ft. Troy Warren|| Best Instrumental Song|| Just Plain Folks Music Award||  
|-
| 2017 || If I Knew || Best Adult Contemporary || Hollywood Music in Media Awards||

References

1960 births
Living people
American women singer-songwriters
Singer-songwriters from Texas
21st-century American women